Sinbad the Sailor is a 1947 American Technicolor fantasy film directed by Richard Wallace and starring Douglas Fairbanks, Jr., Maureen O'Hara, Walter Slezak, Anthony Quinn, and Mike Mazurki. It tells the tale of the "eighth" voyage of  Sinbad, wherein he discovers the lost treasure of Alexander the Great.

Plot

The story begins with Sinbad (Douglas Fairbanks, Jr.) regaling a group of travelers around a night-time campfire. When his listeners become bored with his often repeated tales, Sinbad tells them about his "eighth" voyage.

With his friend, Abbu (George Tobias), Sinbad salvages a ship whose crew has been poisoned. On board, he finds a map to the lost treasure of Alexander the Great on the fabled island of Deryabar. However, when he sails to Basra, the ship is confiscated by the local Khan, to be sold at auction. Sinbad obtains an agreement that he may keep the ship if there are no bids. He scares away all the bidders with not-so-subtle comments about the ship being cursed. At the last moment, one bidder appears, a veiled woman borne by four servants. She is Shireen (O'Hara), part of the harem of the powerful Emir of Daibul (Anthony Quinn). Sinbad bids against her and ends up owing a huge sum he cannot pay. He steals the auctioneer's own money to pay for the ship.

Visiting Shireen that night in her garden, Sinbad learns of a mysterious and deadly person known as Jamal, who will stop at nothing to acquire the treasure. Jamal, only vaguely seen behind a curtain, makes an attempt on Sinbad's life. Sinbad escapes and steals the ship, acquiring a rough crew to man it. Strange stories of the evil Jamal circulate among the crew, but no one alive has ever seen him.

After several days, Sinbad sails to another port and goes, risking death, to visit Shireen in the harem. He is captured, but because the Emir believes him to be the Prince of Deryabar, he becomes his "guest". With his smooth words and some trickery, Sinbad once again escapes, taking Shireen with him. They set sail for Daryabar, but are overtaken and captured by the Emir. It is then revealed that Sinbad's ship's barber, Abdul Melik (Walter Slezak) is none other than Jamal, who has memorized (and then destroyed) the map to Deryabar. Forming an uneasy alliance of convenience, they all sail to the treasure island.

There they convince the lone resident of the ruins of Alexander's palace, the aged Aga (Alan Napier), that Sinbad is his lost son, owing to a medallion Sinbad had since childhood. When the Emir threatens to kill Sinbad, Sinbad confesses his true identity as just a sailor. Nevertheless, Aga capitulates and shows them the fabulous treasure's hiding place. He later informs Sinbad that he had given his son to sailors to shield him from treasure hunters; Sinbad is indeed his son and the true Prince of Daryabar.

When it is discovered that Jamal had intended to poison the Emir and his crew to have the treasure to himself, the Emir forces him to drink the deadly liquid himself. Sinbad escapes again, boards the Emir's ship and frees his crew. The Emir is killed by Greek fire catapulted at him from his own ship.

The disbelieving listeners around the campfire accuse Sinbad of telling yet another tall tale, but soon change their minds when he distributes precious jewels and gold. The beautiful Shireen appears and they board the ship for their return to Deryabar as Sinbad relates the moral of the tale, that true happiness is found in things other than material wealth.

Main cast
 Douglas Fairbanks, Jr. as Sinbad
 Maureen O'Hara as Shireen
 Walter Slezak as Melik
 Anthony Quinn as Emir
 George Tobias as Abbu
 Jane Greer as Pirouze
 Mike Mazurki as Yusuf
 Sheldon Leonard as Auctioneer
 Alan Napier as Aga
 John Miljan as Moga
 Brad Dexter as Muallin

Production

Film planning started in March 1944, when The Hollywood Reporter announced that it was to be produced by William Pereira, under the supervision of Jack Gross. RKO borrowed George Tobias from Warner Bros. for the production. Ellis St John wrote an original screen play.

In October 1945, RKO announced that Maureen O'Hara would star in the film. John Twist was already writing a new screen play, while Stephen Ames was producing the feature. The film's production budget was also set at $2,500,000. By December, Walter Slezak had been cast as the villain. Both he and O'Hara had starred in RKO's popular swashbuckler, The Spanish Main (1945).

RKO signed Douglas Fairbanks, Jr. in December 1945 to star as Sinbad. It was his first feature film role after his having served five years in the US Navy during World War II. He convinced the studio to engage a number of supporting actors and stuntmen that had worked originally with his silent movie star father, Douglas Fairbanks, Sr.

Fairbanks said it was the last film he intended to make for a straight up salary. As part of his deal, he was given an office with a secretary and had input on the screen play, sets, wardrobe, etc.

In January 1946, Richard Wallace agreed to direct the film.

Filming began in February 1946.

Release
RKO had originally planned to release the film for the 1946 Christmas season, but a strike at the Technicolor processing plant delayed the making of the color prints. The wide-release date was consequently moved to January 13, 1947, and RKO instead chose Frank Capra's black-and-white It's a Wonderful Life as their big 1946 Christmas movie.

Box office
The film cost $2,459,000 to make and earned a modest profit at the box office.

Douglas Fairbanks Jr. later said "Errol Flynn told me I'd made a big mistake because nobody was interested in swashbuckling, and I had to agree. Receipts were thin".

See also
 Sinbad the Sailor (1935 film)
 One Thousand and One Nights

References

External links

 
 
 
 

1947 films
1940s fantasy films
American fantasy films
Films directed by Richard Wallace
RKO Pictures films
Seafaring films
Films based on Sinbad the Sailor
Films scored by Roy Webb
Films set in the 8th century
Treasure hunt films
1940s American films